Chingford was a parliamentary constituency centred on the town of Chingford in the London Borough of Waltham Forest.  It returned one Member of Parliament (MP)  to the House of Commons of the Parliament of the United Kingdom by the first past the post system.

History
The constituency existed from February 1974 until it was abolished for the 1997 general election. It was held by the Conservative Party throughout this period. Both of its former Members of Parliament are well known, being Norman Tebbit and Iain Duncan Smith.

Boundaries
1974–1983: The London Borough of Waltham Forest wards of Chapel End, Chingford Central, Chingford North West, Chingford South, and Hale End.

1983–1997: The London Borough of Waltham Forest wards of Chapel End, Chingford Green, Endlebury, Hale End, Hatch Lane, Larkswood, and Valley.

The seat was created out of the old Epping and Walthamstow East constituencies, and no part of it was ever in the post-1965 administrative county of Essex. It was replaced in 1997 by the new Chingford and Woodford Green constituency.

Members of Parliament

Elections

Elections in the 1970s

Elections in the 1980s

Elections in the 1990s

References

Parliamentary constituencies in London (historic)
Constituencies of the Parliament of the United Kingdom established in 1974
Constituencies of the Parliament of the United Kingdom disestablished in 1997
Politics of the London Borough of Waltham Forest
Chingford